John Andrew Holden (22 October 1948 – 4 January 2014) was an English long distance runner whose athletic career peaked in the 1970s. His strongest event was the 3000 m steeplechase, a discipline at which he represented his country in the 1972 Summer Olympics.

Holden's best performance in the steeplechase was 8:26.4 in September 1972, setting a British record. His time was still in the national all-time top 20 at the time of his death 42 years later. After his track career ended, Holden switched to road racing, where he continued to race in the veteran categories for many years. His best of 28:29 for the 10 km road race is a British record for over-35s.

Biography
Holden was raised in the Lancashire town of Leyland, and represented Preston Harriers as a junior, typically in cross country. In 1968, he went to the University of Birmingham to study dentistry. While at university, he won the junior title in the 1969 English Cross Country Championships, beating future world 10,000 m record holder Dave Bedford.

Holden's first experience of senior international competition came in 1969, when he was selected for an international cross country meeting in Braaschaat, Belgium. The race finished with a British 1–2–3 in which Holden was second, behind Ron Hill and ahead of Bedford. Two months later, Holden was part of the England team that won the team competition at the 1969 International Cross Country Championships; Holden was placed 24th. On the track, Holden finished third in the 3000 m steeplechase in the AAA Championships, but was overlooked in the selections for the 1969 European Championships. His first win in an international meeting came in Verona in August 1969. His time was initially thought to be a British record for the steeplechase, but the course was found to be short when remeasured.

1970 started well for Holden; he won the British University cross country championship for the second year running. In his first major track championship, the 1970 British Commonwealth Games, Holden placed 5th in the 3000 m steeplechase. The following month, he won the AAA title. Holden then won silver in the 3000 m steeplechase in the 1970 World Student Games, behind European champion Mikhail Zhelev. As the season drew to a close, Holden faced Kip Keino, the 3000 m world record holder, in a 3000 m race at an indoor meeting. Holden raced from the front and pushed the Kenyan hard, but was overtaken in the final 100 m.

Holden retained his AAA steeplechase title in 1971. A meeting at Crystal Palace in September saw Holden battle Dave Bedford for the British steeplechase record. Holden trailed Bedford by four seconds after three laps, but caught his rival with 800 m remaining. Bedford prevailed in a sprint finish, by a margin of 0.2 seconds. Though beaten by Bedford, Holden's time of 8:28.8 was two seconds faster than the previous record, set by Gerry Stevens.

Holden was unable to claim a third successive university cross country title in 1972. Racing only a few weeks after having an appendectomy, he finished second. Holden represented Great Britain in the 3000 m steeplechase in the 1972 Summer Olympics, but finished fifth in his heat and was eliminated. At the close of the outdoor track season, at the same meeting he had tussled with Bedford the previous year, Holden set a British record for the 3000 m steeplechase. At 8:26.4, the time was 2.2 seconds faster than that set by Bedford.

Throughout his athletic career, Holden remained an amateur. After he qualified as a dentist, Holden settled in the West Midlands, and practised dentistry full-time alongside his athletic activities. He was also known for his ability to remain competitive despite drinking large quantities of alcohol. He is alleged to have drunk ten pints of beer the night before winning the 1979 Bermuda marathon in a course-record time, and he once ran  and drank  of beer in a single week.

In later years, Holden focused on the marathon; his personal best at the distance was 2:15:17, a performance that gave him third place in the 1980 AAA championship. His marathon experience also included the inaugural European Marathon Cup in 1981, in which he finished 26th. His best marathon performance in the AAA championships was second in 1981.  He won the 1982 Hong Kong Marathon in a time of 2:17:43. An unusual mishap denied him victory in the 1986 Belfast Marathon, after the lead car twice took a wrong turn, at 7 and 22 miles. The lost time proved crucial; Holden was caught with 400 yards to go and lost by 10 seconds. Holden represented his local club Tipton Harriers, where he also coached, for several decades, and continued to race until the 1990s.

Holden died on 4 January 2014, having suffered health problems since an aortic aneurysm three years before.

References

1948 births
2014 deaths
People from Leyland, Lancashire
Sportspeople from Lancashire
English male marathon runners
English male steeplechase runners
British male steeplechase runners
Olympic athletes of Great Britain
Athletes (track and field) at the 1972 Summer Olympics
Alumni of the University of Birmingham
Universiade medalists in athletics (track and field)
Universiade silver medalists for Great Britain
Medalists at the 1970 Summer Universiade
Athletes (track and field) at the 1970 British Commonwealth Games
Commonwealth Games competitors for England